Rough Butt Creek is a stream in Jackson County, North Carolina, in the United States. It is located within the Nantahala National Forest.

A hiking trail along Rough Butt Creek leads to a  waterfall.

See also
List of rivers of North Carolina

References

Rivers of Jackson County, North Carolina
Rivers of North Carolina